Fearnley may refer to:
Fearnley (Norwegian family)
Albert Fearnley, English rugby league footballer who played in the 1950s, and coached in the 1960s and 1970s (father of Stanley Fearnley)
Duncan Fearnley, English cricketer and cricket bat manufacturer
Gordon Fearnley, English soccer player
Harry Fearnley (footballer born 1923), English soccer player
Harry Fearnley (footballer born 1935), English soccer player
James Fearnley, English musician
Kurt Fearnley, Australian wheelchair racer
Michael Fearnley, English cricketer
Stanley Fearnley, English rugby league footballer who played in the 1960s, and 1970s (son of Albert Fearnley)
Terry Fearnley, Australian rugby league footballer who played in the 1950s and 1960s, and coach in the 1970s and 1980s
Hugh Fearnley-Whittingstall, English celebrity chef, smallholder, television presenter and journalist
Jane Fearnley-Whittingstall, English writer and garden designer